Felix Anthony Plastino (June 25, 1895 – November 25, 1957) was an American player and coach of college football. He was head coach at the University of Idaho–Southern Branch (now Idaho State University) in Pocatello from 1928 to 1934.

Early years
Born in 1895 in Provo, Utah, Plastino first played college football at Idaho Technical Institute in Pocatello, Idaho. He served in the United States Army during World War I. Following his military service, Plastino resumed his college football career at the University of Idaho in Moscow, where he was elected team captain in 1920.

Coaching
In June 1928, Plastino was named to succeed Ralph Hutchinson as head coach of the Idaho Southern Branch football team.

After coaching
Later in life, Plastino was active in politics in the Democratic Party of Jerome County, Idaho. He also had an Army intelligence role in Washington, D.C. He died in Vienna, Virginia, in 1957 and was survived by his wife and five children. In 1979, Plastino was inducted to the athletic hall of fame at Idaho State University.

Head coaching record

College football

Notes

References

1895 births
1957 deaths
People from Provo, Utah
Idaho Vandals football players
High school football coaches in Idaho
High school basketball coaches in Idaho
Idaho State Bengals football coaches
Idaho State Bengals men's basketball coaches
United States Army personnel of World War I